Gungralchatra Tammegowda  Devegowda is an Indian politician who was the Minister of Higher Education of Karnataka in the  JDS and Indian National Congress Coalition government in the Second H. D. Kumaraswamy ministry from 23 May 2018 to 23 July 2019. He started his political career with Congress in the 1970s, and later joined Janata Dal (Secular). In the 2018 Karnataka Legislative Assembly election, he won by a large margin against the incumbent chief minister Siddaramaiah, from Chamundeshwari Assembly segment.

References

External links
 
 www.gtdevegowda.in
 G.T Devegowda at Myneta

Living people
Politicians from Mysore
Janata Dal (Secular) politicians
Janata Party politicians
Janata Dal politicians
Karnataka MLAs 2004–2007
Karnataka MLAs 2013–2018
Karnataka MLAs 2018–2023
1949 births